Peter Rona, born as Peter Rosenfeld (* 13. May 1871 in Budapest; † February or March 1945) was a Hungarian German Jewish physician and physiologist.

References

Biochemists
1871 births
1945 deaths
Academic staff of the Humboldt University of Berlin
20th-century Hungarian physicians
Physicians from Budapest
Jews executed by Nazi Germany
Hungarian civilians killed in World War II